The 2009–10 Philadelphia Flyers season was the Flyers' 43rd season in the National Hockey League (NHL).

The Flyers began the 2009–10 season with some major changes, allowing goaltenders Martin Biron and Antero Niittymaki to depart via free agency, replacing them with former Ottawa Senators netminder Ray Emery and former Flyer Brian Boucher, and significantly upgrading the defense with the addition of Chris Pronger from the Anaheim Ducks. Pronger came at a price, costing the Flyers Joffrey Lupul, Luca Sbisa, and the Flyers' first round draft picks in 2009 and 2010. The season began in earnest but soon began to unravel with mediocre play that cost John Stevens his job in December. Peter Laviolette was hired as head coach in order to re-institute accountability and restore success to the Flyers but the results were not immediate, as the Flyers suffered a 2–7–1 stretch after his arrival. This was corrected with an 18–7–1 stretch in the middle of the season. Injuries took a major toll on the Flyers, with Blair Betts, Danny Brière, Jeff Carter, Simon Gagné and Kimmo Timonen missing significant numbers of games, but no position was nearly affected as much with injuries as goaltending with Emery suffering a career-threatening injury. Mediocre play down the stretch forced the Flyers into a do-or-die shootout with the New York Rangers in the last game of the regular season for a playoff berth. Boucher stopped final shooter Olli Jokinen to clinch the seventh seed in the East and a first round match-up with the New Jersey Devils.

In the first round of the playoffs, Boucher and the Flyers consistently outplayed Martin Brodeur and New Jersey and pulled off the upset in five games. However, the victory was costly as Carter suffered a broken foot, Gagne a broken toe in Game 4 and Ian Laperrière suffered a fractured orbital bone by blocking a shot in Game 5. The Flyers faced the sixth-seeded Boston Bruins in the second round, and despite playing at an even level with Boston, the Flyers found themselves in a 3–0 series deficit. Gagne returned from injury in game 4, scoring the game-winning goal in overtime. The Flyers shut out the Bruins 4-0 in game 5, despite losing goaltender Boucher to injury. A 2–1 Flyers win in Game 6 forced a Game 7 in Boston. Falling behind 3–0 in Game 7, the Flyers pulled off the biggest comeback in franchise history, winning 4–3 on a late goal by Gagne to join the 1942 Toronto Maple Leafs, 1975 New York Islanders and the 2004 Boston Red Sox as the only sports teams to win a playoff series after trailing 3–0.

In the Eastern Conference Finals, the Flyers had home-ice advantage as they faced the eighth-seeded Montreal Canadiens. Michael Leighton became the first Flyers netminder to record three shutouts in a series, and Jeff Carter and Ian Laperriere returned to the lineup as the Flyers won the Eastern Conference Championship in five games and advanced to the Stanley Cup Finals for the first time since ; the Chicago Blackhawks were their opponents. Patrick Kane scored just over four minutes into overtime in Game 6 to eliminate the Flyers and give Chicago their first Stanley Cup since . Ville Leino, acquired in a mid-season trade from the Detroit Red Wings, set the Flyers rookie playoff scoring record and tied the NHL record with 21 points.

Off-season

The Flyers began preparing for the season by signing controversial goalie Ray Emery prior to the official start of free agency. Emery, who had spent the previous season in the Russian Kontinental Hockey League (KHL), signed a one-year contract worth US$1.5 million. Former Flyer Brian Boucher was signed to a two-year contract on the first day of free agency to serve as Emery's backup. As a result, the team's goaltending tandem of the past two seasons, starter Martin Biron and backup Antero Niittymaki, signed with the New York Islanders and Tampa Bay Lightning, respectively, as unrestricted free agents. The Flyers also signed right winger Ian Laperriere to a three-year contract and lost Mike Knuble as a free agent to the Washington Capitals.

Longtime defenseman Derian Hatcher also retired at the beginning of the off-season (after missing all of last season due to knee surgery), replacing Eric Desjardins as the team's player development coach. Desjardins stepped down due to personal business interests. Other staff changes included the Flyers hiring Jeff Reese as their new goalie coach to replace Reggie Lemelin and promoting former Phantoms coach John Paddock to assistant general manager.

At the Entry Draft, the Flyers made a blockbuster trade for Anaheim Ducks' defenseman Chris Pronger, a former Hart Trophy winner as league MVP and Norris Trophy winner as the league's best defenseman. Along with Pronger, the Flyers also received minor league forward Ryan Dingle in exchange for winger Joffrey Lupul, defenseman Luca Sbisa, first round picks in 2009 and 2010 and a conditional third round pick. They quickly signed Pronger to a seven-year contract extension worth approximately $34 million. Nearly a month after signing, the NHL announced they had launched an investigation on Pronger's deal to determine whether it was a circumvention of the salary cap under the collective bargaining agreement. Because the contract is front-loaded, with annual salaries of just $525,000 in the final two years, and expires by the time Pronger is 42, the investigation was launched with the focus on the potential of negotiations between Pronger and the Flyers to retire before contract expiration. However, as Pronger's contract took effect after his 35th birthday, under the terms of the current collective bargaining agreement, his over-35 contract cannot be deleted from the Flyers' cap space unless he is placed on long-term injured reserve, and even then it would come back on the team's cap space during the offseason.

Regular season
The 2009–10 season started for the Flyers with the successful return of Ray Emery to the NHL, shutting out the Carolina Hurricanes. However, what followed was inconsistent play of the entire team throughout October though a successful record could be maintained. The last game in October started a five-game winning streak. However, this effort would be largely in vain as a road trip to the west coast and ensuing games at the end of the month saw the Flyers lose six of seven games. After being shut out by the Atlanta Thrashers and Vancouver Canucks in consecutive games, general manager Paul Holmgren relieved Head Coach John Stevens from his duties and hired Peter Laviolette in his stead.

The change behind the bench however only showed little immediate impact. The very first game for Laviolette saw his team being dominated by the Washington Capitals and Daniel Carcillo punching out Matt Bradley, for which Carcillo would be suspended for four games. Up until Christmas break the team showed little improvement with a 2–7–1 stretch from Laviolettes installation on December 4 to December 21.

The team was also marred with injuries up until that point. Simon Gagne had to have hernia surgery and was sidelined for two months. Blair Betts suffered a separated shoulder in early October and reinjured the shoulder a few games after his return in mid-November. Danny Briere suffered a tweaked groin and also missed time due to a suspension and the flu. The team also played hurt a lot. James van Riemsdyk suffered an injury to his pinky finger after being hit with a puck but did not miss any games for it. Ian Laperriere, on the other hand, was hit in the mouth with the puck on November 27 and would lose seven teeth but only miss one period of play. Defenseman Kimmo Timonen also suffered a broken toe.

The worst injury, however, was to goaltender Ray Emery, who suffered an abdominal tear and went out of the line-up in early December. A short return came in late January but Emery reinjured and had to undergo hip-surgery ending his season in early March. After continuing the slump with Boucher in net, the Flyers picked up Michael Leighton from waivers, who had fallen out of favor with the Carolina Hurricanes with a goals against average (GAA) above 4.00 and a save percentage below .850. However, Leighton would turn his season around with the Flyers with an 8–0–1 record in ten consecutive starts after he had been picked up. His season too would end early with a 16–5–2 record after suffering a high ankle sprain in a game against Nashville on March 16.

An early season highlight was November 16, when Dave Schultz was inducted in the Flyers Hall of Fame. Another honor was given to James van Riemsdyk, who was awarded Rookie of the Month for November 2009 by the NHL. Throughout December, five Flyers were selected for the roster of their home country in the 2010 Winter Olympics. Mike Richards and Chris Pronger were picked for Canada and Kimmo Timonen was selected for Finland, while Oskars Bartulis and Ole-Kristian Tollefsen were chosen by Latvia and Norway, respectively, though Tollefsen would be traded before the Olympics began. Jeff Carter was later considered by Team Canada to join the squad in the event that Ryan Getzlaf is unable to play. However, Getzlaf did participate in the tournament and Carter did not. Richards and Pronger would earn gold medals with Canada while Timonen gained a bronze medal with Finland.

The Flyers also played in the 2010 Winter Classic in Fenway Park against the Boston Bruins. Though they held the lead up until the last three minutes of the game, they would ultimately lose in overtime to a goal that had been contested by the Flyers as it appeared that the Bruins had too many men on the ice.

Another controversy struck over a shorthanded goal by Simon Gagne in a 7–4 win against the Pittsburgh Penguins on January 7. The goal had not been given and, after video review, was not awarded, though video evidence shows the puck in the net. However, this angle had not been sent to the video review in Toronto by the FSN Pittsburgh broadcasting team and the call could no longer be overturned after the puck had been dropped. An internal investigation by FSN Pittsburgh as well as an investigation by the NHL followed and a producer was suspended.

For the first time since 1993, the Flyers stayed put during the 2010 NHL trade deadline period with no trades. With only minor changes throughout the season, the team finished almost entirely unchanged from the way it started the season in terms of players. Only the waiver acquisition of Michael Leighton, the season-ending injury to Emery and the trade of Ole-Kristian Tollefsen for Ville Leino showed significant impact to the roster, besides usual promotions and demotions to or from the Flyers' AHL affiliate, the Adirondack Phantoms.

Another key injury knocked Jeff Carter out for five games as a fracture in his left foot halted his streak of consecutive games played at 286. He returned for the last two games of the season.

The Flyers season ended in a dramatic fashion. Wins over the Detroit Red Wings and the Toronto Maple Leafs kept the playoff hopes alive, it came down to a home-and-home series with the New York Rangers to end the season. The Rangers were trying to clinch a playoff spot themselves and needed to win both games to do so. The Flyers lost the first game of that series at Madison Square Garden 4–3, though it was a hard fought battle for both teams. This set up a "Win and you're in" situation for the second game at the Wachovia Center, with the winner advancing to the playoffs and the loser being eliminated. Jody Shelley scored early for the Rangers but New York could not extend that lead. The Flyers put continuous pressure on the Rangers with Henrik Lundqvist playing a stellar game to keep the Flyers off the board until Matt Carle put a rebound behind him halfway through the third period tying the game 1–1. Neither team scored again until the shootout, in which a goal by Claude Giroux forced Olli Jokinen to score to keep the Rangers playoff hopes alive. However, Brian Boucher made the crucial save and with that clinching the playoff spot for the Flyers and ending the Rangers' season.

Divisional standings

Conference standings

Playoffs

Eastern Conference Quarterfinals
The Flyers drew their division rival New Jersey Devils for the opening round of the playoffs as the Devils clinched second place in the conference by defeating the Buffalo Sabres in their final game of the season. Buffalo would have been the Flyers' opponents had the Sabres managed to keep the Devils without a point from that game. The Flyers won five of six games against the Devils during the regular season. The Devils managed to secure the second seed going into the playoffs, thus guaranteeing them the home ice advantage in the first round against the Flyers.

As the season series promised, the Flyers matched up well with the Devils and took Game 1 in a 2–1 decision at Prudential Center. The Flyers had shut out the Devils until there were only three minutes remained in the game but could hold on to the lead to finish out the game. An equally hard-fought game was the second in the series which the Devils took in a 5–3 victory. With a split in New Jersey, the series turned to Philadelphia.

Game 3 saw an unlikely hero in Daniel Carcillo, who scored the 3–2 game winner 3:35 into overtime giving him his second point of the night in 7:11 of ice-time. He assisted on a goal by Mike Richards in the second period. Game 4 at Wachovia Center saw the Flyers win the game 4–1 on a three-point night by Jeff Carter, who played with a screw inserted in his broken foot. However, that win would prove costly, as Carter broke his other foot on the play for his second goal and Simon Gagne suffered a broken big toe in his right foot.

This would set up situation similar to the 2000 Eastern Conference Finals, in which the Flyers, on the strong play of Brian Boucher, took a 3–1 series lead over the Devils, only to see it melt away and lose in seven games. However, history would not repeat itself. Boucher would earn his first playoff shutout in 10 years in a 3–0 decision in Game 5, eliminating the Devils. This was the third consecutive time the Devils would exit the playoffs in the first round. Claude Giroux contributed to all three goals, assisting Danny Briere on a goal in the first period and scoring twice himself in the second. That win saw another injury though, as Ian Laperriere was hit in the face by a slapshot in a situation reminiscent of an incident earlier in the season, which cost him seven teeth. Laperriere was hit above the right eye and suffered a large gash across his eyebrow which reportedly required 50–70 stitches.

The series was influenced strongly by the play of Mike Richards, who had four multi-point games in the series that lasted five games. However, the series was also marred with a large number of obstruction penalties called. In five games, there were 72 minor penalties and three game misconducts handed out for a total of 174 penalty minutes between both teams.

Eastern Conference semifinals
The Flyers would meet the Boston Bruins in the next round, who had dispatched the Buffalo Sabres in six games. The Bruins were noted in that series for being perfect on the penalty kill, negating all 19 chances the Sabres had in that series. However, due to the Flyers having started on the first day of the playoffs and their beating of the Devils in quick fashion, the Flyers had more than a week off. While this would provide some opportunity for their injured players to heal, the Flyers were notorious for not responding well to long rests during the regular season. This would show during Game 1 in the series, as the Flyers gave up the first goal less than three minutes into the game and leave the first period down 2–0. However, the Flyers would rally and tie the game at 4–4 in the second half of the third period on goals by Mike Richards and Danny Briere. This, however, would only set up the heroics of Marc Savard, who had returned from missing several weeks with a concussion.

Game 2 was a similar story. The Bruins caught the early lead 5:12 into the game and while the Flyers were able to catch up twice, they could not take the lead and a goal by Milan Lucic with less than three minutes to go in the game would spell victory for the Bruins. In the third game, the Flyers were finally able to take a lead with Arron Asham scoring only 2:32 into the game. The lead would not last long though, as Blake Wheeler and Miroslav Satan would answer in quick succession, 1:34 apart and less than two minutes after Asham's goal, to take the lead. The Flyers were unable to score again and with a lackluster third period by Philadelphia, the game ended in a 4–1 Bruins victory. During the game Mike Richards broke the arm of bruins center David Krejci in a large open ice hit, knocking Krejci out for the rest of the series.

The Flyers were now on the brink of elimination down three games to none. However, on the upside, Simon Gagne returned for Game 4, which turned into a bizarre mirror version of the first game of the series. While the Flyers were able to take a big 3–1 lead, they saw it melt away on a few strange goals. The Flyers would retake the lead again, but Mark Recchi would tie it with 20 seconds left in the game. However, Gagne would put an end to it scoring at 14:40 in overtime to keep the Flyers alive and send the series back to Boston. There the Flyers would dominate, shutting out the Bruins for a 4–0 victory to climb back into the series. However, the shutout was not held by a single goalie, as Brian Boucher would go down with injuries in both of his knees after Flyers defenseman Ryan Parent and Bruins forward Miroslav Satan fell on top of him. This would call Michael Leighton back into action, who had only just returned at that very game from a high-ankle sprain that had sidelined him since mid-March.

Leighton's heroics would continue in Game 6 after making 14 saves in Game 5 to preserve the shutout Boucher had started. He would keep the Bruins off the scoreboard for 59 minutes until Milan Lucic scored and make 30 saves total. However, at that point, the Flyers would hold on to a 2–1 lead to send the series to a deciding Game 7 at TD Garden.

Game 7 would play out very much like the series itself. The Bruins would jump to a 3–0 lead in the first period. Two of the goals came on the power play due to infractions for high-sticking on Scott Hartnell and Danny Briere, respectively. This would prompt head coach Peter Laviolette to use up his timeout to rally the team. Shortly after, James van Riemsdyk, who had not registered a goal in the playoffs until that point, scored to make it 3–1. The second period was all Flyers, as Hartnell and Briere would redeem themselves by scoring a goal each to tie the game up at 3–3. Overall, the game was relatively low on penalties, with only six minors being called total, but the last one of those, a bench penalty for Too Many Men, would come to haunt Boston, as Simon Gagne put the puck in the net for a 4–3 Flyers lead. The Flyers would be able to hold on to it and become only the third team in NHL history, the fourth team in the big four American professional sports leagues, to return from an 0–3 deficit of games to win that playoff series.

Eastern Conference finals
The Flyers were matched up with the Montreal Canadiens in the Eastern Conference Finals. This would be the first time the seventh and eighth seed would meet in a conference final. The Canadiens previously defeated the Presidents' Trophy winner Washington Capitals and the reigning Stanley Cup champions Pittsburgh Penguins, each in seven-game series, largely on the strong play of goaltender Jaroslav Halak. The Flyers and Canadiens split their season series 2–2.

However, despite being evenly matched during the season, the Flyers took advantage of their momentum and opened the series completely dominating the Canadiens in a 6–0 shutout despite being outshot 28–25. Six different Flyers scored goals in that game. While the Canadiens improved in Game 2, the story only repeated itself, as the Habs were shut-out again in a 3–0 decision.

With this, the series would go to Montreal, where the tables would quickly turn. The Flyers had an overall poor effort in a 5–1 loss, especially by their top defense pairing of Chris Pronger and Matt Carle, who were both -3. The game also ended somewhat controversially, as the last goal was scored by Montreal on a 5-on-3 power play and Montreal decided to put their top powerplay unit on the ice, despite less than a minute to play.

The Flyers reflected on their bad play and improved it. At the same time, Jeff Carter and Ian Laperriere, both missing at least ten games since the conference quarterfinals, would return to the line-up, providing reinforcements. Pronger and Carle bounced back and Claude Giroux had an outstanding night as the Flyers shut-out the Canadiens once again 3–0 in Game 4. This would make Michael Leighton the first Flyer goaltender to post three shutouts in one playoff series, tying an NHL record. The Flyers held the Canadiens to a single shot during the second period.

With their backs against the wall, the Canadiens found themselves in a situation which they had already played in five times that post-season, winning all of their elimination games. The team showed their desperation as they scored less than a minute into Game 5. However, Flyers captain Mike Richards would answer the bell with a shorthanded goal four minutes later. In the second period, the Flyers would take the lead on goals by Arron Asham and Jeff Carter, which they carried into the third. There, however, Scott Gomez would profit off a misplay and cut the lead to one. This would set up a dangerous situation which would worsen, as Chris Pronger was called on a double-minor for high sticking halfway through the period. The Flyers would, however, kill the penalty off and Jeff Carter, with the help of Mike Richards, scored into the empty net to seal the deal at 4–2 after the Canadiens had pulled their goalie.

This clinched the Flyers' first Stanley Cup Final berth since  and the eighth in franchise history. It would also mark another run for the Cup for Chris Pronger, who returned to the finals for the third time since the NHL lockout, each time pushing a team that traded for him the previous off-season into the Finals.

Stanley Cup Finals

The Flyers met the Chicago Blackhawks in the 2010 Stanley Cup Finals. Chicago swept their Western Conference Finals opponent San Jose Sharks 4–0 after dispatching the Nashville Predators and Vancouver Canucks in six games each. The only regular season meeting between the two teams ended dramatically, as Chris Pronger scored the deciding goal for the 3–2 victory of the Flyers with less than three seconds left in regulation.

In the finals, the Blackhawks defeated the Flyers in six games. Patrick Kane scoring the Game 6 overtime winning goal.

Schedule and results

Preseason

|- style="background:#fcf;"
| 1 || September 16 || @ Detroit Red Wings || 1–3 || 15,115 || 0–1–0 ||
|- style="background:#fcf;"
| 2 || September 17 || Toronto Maple Leafs || 0–4 || 9,090 || 0–2–0 ||
|- style="background:#ffc;"
| 3 || September 19 || @ Toronto Maple Leafs || 4–5 (OT) || 18,609 || 0–2–1 ||
|- style="background:#cfc;"
| 4 || September 22 || Detroit Red Wings || 5–2|| 18,055 || 1–2–1 ||
|- style="background:#cfc;"
| 5 || September 24 || New Jersey Devils || 2–1 (OT) || 17,650 || 2–2–1 ||
|- style="background:#fcf;"
| 6 || September 26 || @ New Jersey Devils || 0–1 || 11,167 || 2–3–1 ||
|- style="background:#ffc;"
| 7 || September 29 || Minnesota Wild || 4–5 (SO) || 17,395 || 2–3–2 ||
|-
| colspan="7" style="text-align:center;"|
Notes:
 Game played at John Labatt Centre in London, Ontario.
|-

|-
|Legend:

Regular season

|- style="background:#cfc;"
| 1 || October 2 || Philadelphia || 2–0 || Carolina ||  || Emery  || 18,680 || 1–0–0 || 2 || 
|- style="background:#cfc;"
| 2 || October 3 || Philadelphia || 5–2 || New Jersey ||  || Emery || 17,625 || 2–0–0 || 4 || 
|- style="background:#cfc;"
| 3 || October 6 || Washington || 5–6  || Philadelphia || OT || Emery  || 19,567 || 3–0–0 || 6 || 
|- style="background:#fcf;"
| 4 || October 8 || Pittsburgh || 5–4 || Philadelphia ||  || Emery || 19,611 || 3–1–0 || 6 || 
|- style="background:#ffc;"
| 5 || October 10 || Anaheim || 3–2 || Philadelphia ||SO  || Emery || 19,603 || 3–1–1 || 7 || 
|- style="background:#fcf;"
| 6 || October 16 || Philadelphia || 2–4 || Florida ||  || Emery || 15,557 ||3–2–1  || 7 || 
|- style="background:#cfc;"
| 7 || October 22 || Boston || 3–4  || Philadelphia || SO || Emery || 19,303 || 4–2–1 || 9 || 
|- style="background:#cfc;"
| 8 || October 24 || Florida ||1–5  || Philadelphia ||  ||Emery  || 19,007 || 5–2–1 ||11 || 
|- style="background:#fcf;"
| 9 || October 25 || San Jose ||4–1  || Philadelphia ||  ||Boucher  || 19,126 || 5–3–1 ||11 || 
|- style="background:#fcf;"
| 10 || October 27 || Philadelphia || 2–4 || Washington ||  || Emery || 18,277 || 5–4–1 || 11 || 
|- style="background:#cfc;"
| 11 || October 31 || Carolina || 1–6 || Philadelphia ||  || Emery || 19,076 || 6–4–1 ||13 || 
|-

|- style="background:#cfc;"
| 12 || November 2 || Tampa Bay || 2–6 || Philadelphia ||  || Emery || 18,667 || 7–4–1 ||15 || 
|- style="background:#cfc;"
| 13 || November 6 || Philadelphia || 5–2 || Buffalo ||  || Emery || 18,525 || 8–4–1 || 17 || 
|- style="background:#cfc;"
| 14 || November 7 || St. Louis || 1–2 || Philadelphia || SO || Emery || 19,542 || 9–4–1 || 19 || 
|- style="background:#cfc;"
| 15 || November 12 || Ottawa || 1–5 || Philadelphia ||  || Emery || 19,321 || 10–4–1 || 21 || 
|- style="background:#fcf;"
| 16 || November 14 || Buffalo || 3–2 || Philadelphia ||  || Emery || 19,641 || 10–5–1 || 21 || 
|- style="background:#cfc;"
| 17 || November 16 || New Jersey || 2–3 || Philadelphia ||  || Emery || 19,673 || 11–5–1 || 23 || 
|- style="background:#cfc;"
| 18 || November 18 || Philadelphia || 3–2 || Los Angeles ||  || Boucher || 17,821 || 12–5–1 || 25 || 
|- style="background:#fcf;"
| 19 || November 20 || Philadelphia || 3–6 || San Jose ||  || Emery ||17,562  || 12–6–1 ||25 || 
|- style="background:#fcf;"
| 20 || November 21 || Philadelphia || 1–3 || Phoenix ||  || Emery ||11,106  || 12–7–1 ||25 || 
|- style="background:#fcf;"
| 21 || November 23 || Philadelphia || 4–5 || Colorado ||  || Boucher || 13,281 || 12–8–1 || 25 || 
|- style="background:#cfc;"
| 22 || November 25 || Philadelphia || 2–1 || NY Islanders ||  || Boucher  || 12,687 || 13–8–1 || 27 || 
|- style="background:#fcf;"
| 23 || November 27 || Buffalo || 4–2 || Philadelphia ||  || Emery  || 19,673 || 13–9–1 || 27 || 
|- style="background:#fcf;"
| 24 || November 28 || Philadelphia || 0–1 || Atlanta ||  || Boucher || 16,018 || 13–10–1 || 27 || 
|-

|- style="background:#fcf;"
| 25 || December 3 || Vancouver || 3–0 || Philadelphia ||  || Boucher || 18,892 || 13–11–1 || 27 || 
|- style="background:#fcf;"
| 26 || December 5 || Washington || 8–2 || Philadelphia ||  || Emery  || 19,789 || 13–12–1  || 27 || 
|- style="background:#fcf;"
| 27 || December 7 || Philadelphia || 1–3 || Montreal ||  || Boucher || 21,273 || 13–13–1 || 27 || 
|- style="background:#cfc;"
| 28 || December 8 || NY Islanders || 2–6|| Philadelphia ||  || Boucher || 19,330 || 14–13–1 || 29 || 
|- style="background:#fcf;"
| 29 || December 10 || Ottawa ||2–0  || Philadelphia ||  ||  Boucher || 19,706 || 14–14–1 || 29 || 
|- style="background:#fcf;"
| 30 || December 12 || Philadelphia ||1–4  || New Jersey ||  || Boucher || 15,724 ||14–15–1  ||29 || 
|- style="background:#cfc;"
| 31 || December 14 || Philadelphia || 3–1 || Boston ||  || Boucher || 17,565 || 15–15–1 || 31 || 
|- style="background:#fcf;"
| 32 || December 15 || Philadelphia || 1–6 || Pittsburgh ||  || Boucher || 17,086 || 15–16–1 || 31 || 
|- style="background:#ffc;"
| 33 || December 17 || Pittsburgh || 3–2 || Philadelphia || SO || Boucher || 19,689 || 15–16–2 || 32 || 
|- style="background:#fcf;"
| 34 || December 19 || NY Rangers || 2–1 || Philadelphia ||  || Boucher || 19,637 || 15–17–2 || 32 || 
|- style="background:#fcf;"
| 35 || December 21 || Florida || 4–1 || Philadelphia ||  || Boucher || 19,323 || 15–18–2 || 32 || 
|- style="background:#cfc;"
| 36 || December 23 || Philadelphia || 5–2 || Tampa Bay ||  || Leighton || 16,177 || 16–18–2 || 34 || 
|- style="background:#cfc;"
| 37 || December 26 || Philadelphia || 4–3 || Carolina || SO || Leighton || 16,288 || 17–18–2 || 36 || 
|- style="background:#cfc;"
| 38 || December 27 || Philadelphia || 2–1 || NY Islanders ||  || Leighton || 12,819 || 18–18–2 || 38 || 
|- style="background:#cfc;"
| 39 || December 30 || Philadelphia || 6–0 || NY Rangers ||  || Leighton || 18,200 || 19–18–2 || 40 || 
|-

|- style="background:#ffc;"
|| 40 || January 1 || Philadelphia || 1–2 || Boston || OT || Leighton || 38,112 || 19–18–3 || 41 || 
|- style="background:#fcf;"
|| 41 || January 3 || Philadelphia || 4–7 || Ottawa || || Boucher ||17,153 || 19–19–3|| 41 || 
|- style="background:#cfc;"
|| 42 || January 6 || Toronto || 2–6 || Philadelphia || || Leighton || 19,617 || 20–19–3 || 43 || 
|- style="background:#cfc;"
|| 43 || January 7 || Philadelphia || 7–4 || Pittsburgh || ||Leighton ||17,095 ||21–19–3 || 45 || 
|- style="background:#cfc;"
|| 44 || January 9 || Tampa Bay ||1–4 || Philadelphia || ||Leighton ||19,678 ||22–19–3 || 47 || 
|- style="background:#cfc;"
|| 45 || January 12 || Dallas || 3–6 || Philadelphia || ||Leighton ||19,133 || 23–19–3 || 49 || 
|- style="background:#fcf;"
|| 46 || January 14 || Philadelphia || 0–4 || Toronto || || Leighton ||19,370 ||23–20–3 ||49 || 
|- style="background:#fcf;"
|| 47 || January 17 || Philadelphia ||3–5 || Washington || ||Emery ||18,277 ||23–21–3 || 49 || 
|- style="background:#cfc;"
|| 48 || January 19 || Columbus ||3–5 || Philadelphia || || Emery ||19,126 ||24–21–3 || 51 || 
|- style="background:#cfc;"
|| 49 || January 21 || NY Rangers || 0–2 || Philadelphia || ||Emery ||19,631 || 25–21–3||53 || 
|- style="background:#cfc;"
|| 50 || January 23 || Carolina || 2–4 || Philadelphia || ||Emery || 19,732|| 26–21–3||55 || 
|- style="background:#fcf;"
|| 51 || January 24 || Pittsburgh ||2–1 || Philadelphia || ||Emery || 19,798||26–22–3 ||55 || 
|- style="background:#fcf;"
|| 52 || January 28 || Atlanta ||4–3 || Philadelphia || || Emery||19,611 ||26–23–3 ||55 || 
|- style="background:#cfc;"
|| 53 || January 30 || NY Islanders || 1–2 || Philadelphia || || Emery ||19,787  ||  27–23–3 || 57 || 
|-
| colspan="11" style="text-align:center;"|
Notes:
 2010 NHL Winter Classic played at Fenway Park in Boston, Massachusetts.
|-

|- style="background:#cfc;"
|| 54 || February 1 || Philadelphia || 3–0|| Calgary || || Emery ||19,289 || 28–23–3||59 || 
|- style="background:#fcf;"
|| 55 || February 3 || Philadelphia || 0–1 || Edmonton || || Leighton|| 16,839||28–24–3 ||59 || 
|- style="background:#fcf;"
|| 56 || February 6 || Philadelphia ||1–2 || Minnesota || ||Leighton ||18,640 ||28–25–3 ||59 || 
|- style="background:#cfc;"
|| 57 || February 8 || New Jersey || 2–3 || Philadelphia || ||Leighton ||19,678 || 29–25–3||61 || 
|- style="background:#cfc;"
|| 58 || February 10 || Philadelphia ||3–2 || New Jersey ||OT || Leighton||5,580 || 30–25–3||63 || 
|- style="background:#cfc;"
|| 59 || February 12 || Montreal ||2–3 || Philadelphia || ||Leighton ||19,803 ||31–25–3 ||65 || 
|- style="background:#cfc;"
|| 60 || February 13 || Philadelphia || 6–2 || Montreal || ||Leighton || 21,273|| 32–25–3||67 || 
|-

|- style="background:#cfc;"
|| 61 || March 2 || Philadelphia || 7–2 || Tampa Bay || || Leighton||17,812 || 33–25–3||69 || 
|- style="background:#fcf;"
|| 62 || March 3 || Philadelphia || 4–7 || Florida || ||Boucher ||15,878 ||33–26–3 ||69 || 
|- style="background:#ffc;" bgcolor="#FFFFFF"
|| 63 || March 5 || Philadelphia || 2–3 || Buffalo ||OT || Leighton|| 18,690|| 33–26–4||70 || 
|- style="background:#cfc;"
|| 64 || March 7 || Toronto || 1–3 || Philadelphia || ||Leighton ||19,632 || 34–26–4||72 || 
|- style="background:#cfc;"
|| 65 || March 9 || NY Islanders || 2–3 || Philadelphia || ||Leighton || 19,687|| 35–26–4||74 || 
|- style="background:#fcf;"
|| 66 || March 11 || Boston || 5–1 || Philadelphia || ||Leighton ||19,673 ||35–27–4 ||74 || 
|- style="background:#cfc;"
|| 67 || March 13 || Chicago || 2–3|| Philadelphia || ||Leighton ||19,858||36–27–4 ||76 || 
|- style="background:#fcf;"
|| 68 || March 14 || Philadelphia || 1–3 || NY Rangers || || Leighton||18,200 || 36–28–4|| 76 || 
|- style="background:#ffc;" bgcolor="#FFFFFF"
|| 69 || March 16 || Philadelphia || 3–4 || Nashville ||SO || Boucher ||16,585 || 36–28–5||77 || 
|- style="background:#cfc;"
|| 70 || March 18 || Philadelphia || 3–2 || Dallas || || Boucher ||17,529 ||37–28–5 ||79 || 
|- style="background:#fcf;"
|| 71 || March 20 || Philadelphia || 2–5 || Atlanta || || Boucher|| 17,024 ||37–29–5 ||79 || 
|- style="background:#fcf;"
|| 72 || March 21 || Atlanta || 3–1 || Philadelphia || || Boucher||19,575 ||37–30–5 ||79 || 
|- style="background:#fcf;"
|| 73 || March 23 || Philadelphia || 0–2 || Ottawa || || Boucher ||19,209 ||37–31–5 || 79 || 
|- style="background:#ffc;"
|| 74 || March 25 || Minnesota || 4–3 || Philadelphia ||OT ||Boucher ||19,716 ||37–31–6 || 80 || 
|- style="background:#fcf;"
|| 75 || March 27 || Philadelphia || 1–4 || Pittsburgh || || Backlund ||17,132 ||37–32–6 ||80 || 
|- style="background:#cfc;"
|| 76 || March 28 || New Jersey || 1–5 || Philadelphia || || Boucher||19,769 || 38–32–6||82 || 
|-

|- style="background:#fcf;"
|| 77 || April 1 || Philadelphia ||4–6 || NY Islanders || ||Boucher ||11,823 ||38–33–6 ||82 || 
|- style="background:#fcf;"
|| 78 || April 2 || Montreal ||1–0 || Philadelphia || ||Boucher || 19,801||38–34–6 || 82 || 
|- style="background:#cfc;"
|| 79 || April 4 || Detroit || 3–4 || Philadelphia || ||Boucher || 19,596|| 39–34–6||84 || 
|- style="background:#cfc;"
|| 80 || April 6 || Philadelphia || 2–0|| Toronto || ||Boucher ||19,366 || 40–34–6||86 || 
|- style="background:#fcf;"
|| 81 || April 9 || Philadelphia || 3–4|| NY Rangers || ||Boucher ||18,200 ||40–35–6 ||86 || 
|- style="background:#cfc;"
|| 82 || April 11 || NY Rangers || 1–2 || Philadelphia ||SO ||Boucher ||19,889 ||41–35–6 ||88 || 
|-

|-
|Legend:

Playoffs

|- style="background:#cfc;"
| 1 || April 14 || Philadelphia || 2–1 || New Jersey || || Boucher || 17,625  || Flyers lead 1–0 || 
|- style="background:#fcf;"
| 2 || April 16 || Philadelphia || 3–5 || New Jersey || ||Boucher  || 17,625 || Series tied 1–1 || 
|- style="background:#cfc;"
| 3 || April 18 || New Jersey || 2–3  || Philadelphia || OT || Boucher || 19,957 || Flyers lead 2–1 || 
|- style="background:#cfc;"
| 4 || April 20 || New Jersey || 1–4  || Philadelphia || || Boucher || 19,709  || Flyers lead 3–1 || 
|- style="background:#cfc;"
| 5 || April 22 || Philadelphia || 3–0 || New Jersey || || Boucher  || 17,625  || Flyers win 4–1 || 
|-

|- style="background:#fcf;"
| 1 || May 1 || Philadelphia || 4–5 || Boston || OT || Boucher || 17,565 || Bruins lead 1–0 || 
|- style="background:#fcf;"
| 2 || May 3 || Philadelphia || 2–3 || Boston ||  || Boucher || 17,565 || Bruins lead 2–0 || 
|- style="background:#fcf;"
| 3 || May 5 || Boston  || 4–1 || Philadelphia ||  || Boucher || 19,688 || Bruins lead 3–0 || 
|- style="background:#cfc;"
| 4 || May 7 || Boston  || 4–5 || Philadelphia || OT || Boucher || 19,702 || Bruins lead 3–1 || 
|- style="background:#cfc;"
| 5 || May 10 || Philadelphia || 4–0 || Boston  || || Boucher || 17,565 || Bruins lead 3–2 || 
|- style="background:#cfc;"
| 6 || May 12 || Boston  || 1–2 || Philadelphia || || Leighton|| 19,929 || Series tied 3–3 || 
|- style="background:#cfc;"
| 7 || May 14 || Philadelphia || 4–3 || Boston  || || Leighton|| 17,565 || Flyers win 4–3 || 
|-

|- style="background:#cfc;"
| 1 || May 16 || Montreal || 0–6 || Philadelphia ||  || Leighton || 19,927 || Flyers lead 1–0 || 
|- style="background:#cfc;"
| 2 || May 18 || Montreal || 0–3 || Philadelphia ||  || Leighton || 19,907 || Flyers lead 2–0 || 
|- style="background:#fcf;"
| 3 || May 20 || Philadelphia  || 1–5 || Montreal|| || Leighton || 21,273 || Flyers lead 2–1 || 
|- style="background:#cfc;"
| 4 || May 22 || Philadelphia  || 3–0 || Montreal|| || Leighton || 21,273 || Flyers lead 3–1 || 
|- style="background:#cfc;"
| 5 || May 24 || Montreal || 2–4 || Philadelphia || || Leighton || 19,986 || Flyers win 4–1 || 
|-

|- style="background:#fcf;"
| 1 || May 29 || Philadelphia || 5–6 || Chicago ||  || Boucher || 22,312 || Blackhawks lead 1–0 || 
|- style="background:#fcf;"
| 2 || May 31 || Philadelphia || 1–2 || Chicago ||  || Leighton || 22,275 || Blackhawks lead 2–0 || 
|- style="background:#cfc;"
| 3 || June 2 || Chicago  || 3–4 || Philadelphia || OT || Leighton || 20,297 || Blackhawks lead 2–1 || 
|- style="background:#cfc;"
| 4 || June 4 || Chicago  || 3–5 || Philadelphia ||  || Leighton || 20,304 || Series tied 2–2 || 
|- style="background:#fcf;"
| 5 || June 6 || Philadelphia || 4–7 || Chicago  || || Boucher || 22,305 || Blackhawks lead 3–2 || 
|- style="background:#fcf;"
| 6 || June 9 || Chicago  || 4–3 || Philadelphia || OT || Leighton || 20,327 || Blackhawks win 4–2 || 
|-

|-
|Legend:

Player statistics

Scoring
 Position abbreviations: C = Center; D = Defense; G = Goaltender; LW = Left Wing; RW = Right Wing
  = Joined team via a transaction (e.g., trade, waivers, signing) during the season. Stats reflect time with the Flyers only.
  = Left team via a transaction (e.g., trade, waivers, release) during the season. Stats reflect time with the Flyers only.

Goaltending
  = Joined team via a transaction (e.g., trade, waivers, signing) during the season. Stats reflect time with the Flyers only.
  = Left team via a transaction (e.g., trade, waivers, release) during the season. Stats reflect time with the Flyers only.

Awards and records

Awards

Records

Among the team records set during the 2009–10 season was three franchise single period records tied during the second period of the home opener on October 6. Mike Richards scored three goals and defenseman Matt Carle picked up four assists (also tying the single period points record). Eight months later Carle would tie the team record for assists in a playoff game (4) in game four of the team’s conference semifinals series against the Boston Bruins. During the conference finals against the Montreal Canadiens, goaltender Michael Leighton tied an NHL single playoff series record with three shutouts. During the 2010 Stanley Cup Finals against the Chicago Blackhawks, Danny Briere set a team record with nine assists in the series.

The Flyers set a number of team single playoff year records during their run to the Stanley Cup Finals. Briere set a new playoff team record for points (30) and tied the high mark for game-winning goals (4). Chris Pronger’s 18 points and three powerplay goals tied the team records for defensemen. Ville Leino set the NHL record for most assists by a rookie (14) and tied the NHL record for most points by a rookie (21). The Flyers tied franchise playoff highs for most home wins (9) and most shutouts (5) while setting new marks for most road losses (7) and most powerplay goals (23).

Transactions
The Flyers were involved in the following transactions from June 13, 2009, the day after the deciding game of the 2009 Stanley Cup Finals, through June 9, 2010, the day of the deciding game of the 2010 Stanley Cup Finals.

Trades

Players acquired

Players lost

Signings

Draft picks

Philadelphia's picks at the 2009 NHL Entry Draft, which was held at Bell Centre in Montreal on June 26–27, 2009. The Flyers traded their 2009, 21st overall, and 2010 first-round picks, Joffrey Lupul, Luca Sbisa and a conditional 2010 or 2011 third-round pick to the Anaheim Ducks for Ryan Dingle and Chris Pronger on June 26, 2009. They also traded their originally allotted second, third, fourth, and seventh-round picks in four separate trades.

Farm teams
American Hockey League – Adirondack Phantoms (Standings)
The Flyers' AHL affiliate team is now the Adirondack Phantoms in Glens Falls, New York for the 2009–10 season. The Phantoms relocated from Philadelphia due to the demolition of the Wachovia Spectrum.

ECHL – Kalamazoo Wings (Standings)

International Hockey League – Quad City Mallards

Notes

References
General
 
 
 
Specific

External links

 Philadelphia Flyers Historical Salaries from CapGeek.com

2009-10
P
2009-10
Phil
2010 Stanley Cup
Philadelphia
Philadelphia